S. A. Malek (18 August 1936 – 6 December 2022) was a Bangladesh Awami League politician who served as Member of Parliament of Faridpur-1.

Malek was born on 18 August 1936 in Tangail, Bangladesh. He died of a heart attack on 6 December 2022, at the age of 86.

Career
Malek was elected to parliament from Faridpur-1 as a Bangladesh Awami League candidate in 1973. He served as the political adviser to Prime Minister Sheikh Hasina from 1996 to 2001. He was the General Secretary of the Bangabandhu Parishad.

References

1936 births
2022 deaths
1st Jatiya Sangsad members
Awami League politicians
People from Faridpur District